Julio Lopez may refer to:
Julio Lopez (footballer), Chilean footballer
Julio López (rower), Spanish rower 
Júlio López (swimmer), Brazilian swimmer
Jorge Julio López, Argentine kidnapping victim